The 1974 Commercial Union Assurance Grand Prix was a professional tennis circuit administered by the International Lawn Tennis Federation (ILTF) which served as a forerunner to the current Association of Tennis Professionals (ATP) World Tour and the Women's Tennis Association (WTA) Tour. The circuit consisted of the four modern Grand Slam tournaments and open tournaments recognised by the ILTF. The season-ending Commercial Union Assurance Masters and Davis Cup Final are included in this calendar but did not count towards the Grand Prix ranking.

Schedule
The Grand Prix circuit was scheduled from May until December so that it would not to conflict with the competing World Championship Tennis circuit which ran from January until early May.

Key

December 1973

May

June

July

August

September

October

November

December

Points system
The tournaments of the Grand Prix circuit were divided into five groups. Group TC consisted of the Triple Crown events—the French Open, the Wimbledon Championships, and the US Open—while the other tournaments were divided into four other groups—AA, A, B, and C—by prize money and draw size. Group AA tournaments had a minimum prize money of $100,000 while the minimum for Group A, B and C tournaments was $75,000, $50,000 and $25,000 respectively. Points were allocated based on these groups and the finishing position of a player in a tournament. No points were awarded to first-round losers, and ties were settled by the number of tournaments played. Grand Prix points were also allocated to doubles results for the first time this year and are listed in brackets in the points allocation below:

In addition a player could earn ranking points for participating in the Davis Cup team competition if the matches coincided with a Grand Prix tournament.

Standings

ATP rankings
These are the ATP rankings of the top twenty singles players at the end of the 1973 season  and at the end of the 1974 season, with numbers of ranking points, points averages, numbers of tournaments played, year-end rankings in 1974, highest and lowest positions during the season and number of spots gained or lost from the first rankings to the year-end rankings.

*The official ATP year-end rankings were listed from January 17th, 1975.

List of tournament winners
The list of winners and number of Grand Prix singles titles won, sorted by number of titles (Grand Slam titles in bold):
 Jimmy Connors (7) Melbourne, Wimbledon, Indianapolis, US Open, Los Angeles, London, Johannesburg
 Guillermo Vilas (7) Gstaad, Hilversum, Louisville, Toronto, Tehran, Buenos Aires, Masters
 Björn Borg (4) Rome, French Open, Båstad, Boston
 Ilie Năstase (4) Bournemouth, Cedar Grove, Madrid, Barcelona
 John Newcombe (3) Maui, Tokyo, Sydney Indoor
 Jeff Borowiak (2) Charlotte, Oslo
 Onny Parun (2) Jakarta, Bombay
 Stan Smith (2) Nottingham, Chicago
 Arthur Ashe (1) Stockholm
 Ross Case (1) San Francisco
 Eddie Dibbs (1) Hamburg
 Jürgen Fassbender (1) Munich
 Vitas Gerulaitis (1) Vienna
 Brian Gottfried (1) Paris Bercy
 Rod Laver (1) Bretton Woods
 John Lloyd (1) Merion
 Alex Metreveli (1) South Orange
 Adriano Panatta (1) Florence
 Raúl Ramírez (1) Columbus
 Marty Riessen (1) Cincinnati
 Ismail El Shafei (1) Manila
 Harold Solomon (1) Washington, D.C.
 Sherwood Stewart (1) Dublin
 Roscoe Tanner (1) Christchurch
 Balázs Taróczy (1) Kitzbühel

The following players won their first Grand Prix title in 1974:
 Björn Borg Auckland
 Jeff Borowiak Charlotte
 Jürgen Fassbender Munich
 Vitas Gerulaitis Vienna
 John Lloyd Merion
 Onny Parun Jakarta
 Ismail El Shafei Manila
 Harold Solomon Washington, D.C.
 Sherwood Stewart Dublin
 Balázs Taróczy Kitzbühel

See also
 1974 World Championship Tennis circuit
 1974 USLTA Indoor Circuit
 1974 WTA Tour

Notes

References

External links
 Commercial Union Grand Prix tournaments
 ATP – History Mens Professional Tours

Further reading

 
Grand Prix tennis circuit seasons
Grand Prix